Albrechtice is a municipality and village in Ústí nad Orlicí District in the Pardubice Region of the Czech Republic. It has about 400 inhabitants.

Geography
It lies in the Zábřeh Highlands, the southwestern part of the municipality extends into the Svitavy Uplands. The village is situated in the valley of the Moravská Sázava river.

References

External links

 

Villages in Ústí nad Orlicí District